Wicked Beat is the second Mini-Album for the Japanese rock duo B'z, released in 1990. The album sold 1,111,230 copies in total, reaching #3 at Oricon.

Track listing 
I Wanna Dance Wicked Beat Style - 4:36
Komachi-Angel Red Hot Style - 4:33
Bad Communication E.Style - 7:20
Lady-Go-Round "W-40" Style - 6:01

Certifications

References 

1990 EPs
B'z EPs
Japanese-language EPs